Jimmy Crawford (July 12, 1944 in East Point, Georgia – May 26, 2007) was a NASCAR Winston Cup Series driver who raced in 15 different races in his five-year career (1970–1974).

Career
While failing to win a race, Crawford has managed to experience  of top-level stock car racing. Originally an airline pilot for Eastern Airlines, Crawford briefly participated in the world of stock car automobiles but he later gave his ride to Donnie Allison and eventually to Pete Hamilton for his final NASCAR race. His total earnings as a NASCAR driver would add up to $15,089 ($ when considering inflation).

References
 Racing Reference
 Ultimate Racing History
 NASCAR Models
 Jayski's NASCAR Silly Season News 2007

1944 births
2007 deaths
NASCAR drivers
Sportspeople from Fulton County, Georgia
Racing drivers from Atlanta
Racing drivers from Georgia (U.S. state)
People from East Point, Georgia
Commercial aviators